Rhyl 1879 is a Welsh football club based in Rhyl in Denbighshire, Wales.  The team currently play in the Ardal NW, which is at the third tier of the Welsh football league system. They are a phoenix club, established following Rhyl FC's formal dissolution in April 2020.

History
A week after the announcement that Rhyl would be liquidated, a group was formed to take forward the idea of a replacement club in Rhyl.  Former Rhyl FC board members Adam Roche and Tom Jamieson agreed to work alongside the Rhyl Fans Association, with Jamieson taking the role of interim chairman. RFA members were balloted and overwhelmingly endorsed the approach.

Rhyl Fans Association ran an online poll for supporters to choose a name for the new club. The unanimous choice was Rhyl FC which fans believed would be acceptable as the former full name of the closed club was Rhyl Football Club Belle Vue Limited. On advice from the Football Association of Wales the club were told a new name would be required. RFA members were again balloted again with 82% voting. CPD Y Rhyl 1879 received 54.6% of the vote and AFC Rhyl received 45.4%.

The club announced it had officially submitted its application to the North Wales Coast FA to play tier four football in 2020–21.

In July 2020 it was confirmed that the club had been placed in the tier four Premier Division of the newly formed North Wales Coast East Football League.

The 2020–21 season was cancelled due to the Covid-19 pandemic. The club's first competitive game was in the 2021–22 Welsh Cup, with a 10–0 home victory over Rhyl Dragons in the first qualifying round. The team progressed through the second qualifying round, beating Prestatyn Sports 2–0 and in the first round, beating Rhydymwyn 1–0. The second round saw them come up against Cymru Premier champions Connah's Quay Nomads, losing 5–0.

The club finished the 2021–22 as league champions and on 9 June 2022, it was announced that the club had been promoted to the tier 3 Ardal NW League for the 2022–23 season.

Ground
In May 2020 it was announced that the club had reached an agreement with David Butters, owner of Belle Vue to use the facilities for the upcoming season, with an exclusive option to purchase the ground. In May 2021 the club signed a two-year lease extension to play at Belle Vue, whilst negotiations to purchase the stadium continued.

Honours
North Wales Coast East Football League Premier Division – Champions: 2021–22
North Wales Coast FA Cookson Cup – Winners 2021–22

Club officials
The club's management committee members are as follows:
 Chairman: Tom Jamieson
 Managing Director & Club Secretary: Adam Roche
 Club Treasurer: Paul Senior
 Media & Comms Officer: Ryan Desmond
 Welsh Community & Safeguarding Officer: John Hughes-Jones
 RFA liaison: Kevin Williams

External links
Official club website
Official club Twitter
Official club Facebook

References

2020 establishments in Wales
Association football clubs established in 2020
Football clubs in Wales
Fan-owned football clubs
Sport in Denbighshire
Rhyl F.C.
North Wales Coast Football League clubs
Rhyl
Ardal Leagues clubs